Yankee Champion is an outdoor 1985 stainless steel sculpture by Thomas Morandi, located on the Portland State University campus in downtown Portland, Oregon, in the United States.

Description and history

Yankee Champion is a welded stainless steel sculpture with an aggregate concrete base by Thomas Morandi, located at the southeast corner of Southwest Broadway and Montgomery Street on the Portland State University campus. Described as a "conglomerate of shapes supported by three irregularly shaped legs", the piece measures approximately  x  x  and weighs 1.5 tons. Morandi worked on Yankee Champion from 1983 to 1985. It was commissioned by the Oregon Percent for Art in Public Places Program in 1984 at a cost of $29,000, and was dedicated on October 24, 1985. Nitric acid was applied to its finished surface to prevent white scaling. A plaque below the sculpture contains the inscription: .

According to the Smithsonian Institution, which categorizes the sculpture as abstract, "responsibility" for Yankee Champion is shared with Portland State University's Art Department by Facilities Management. The university's Art Department is also listed as the work's owner. It was surveyed and deemed "well maintained" by Smithsonian's "Save Outdoor Sculpture!" program in September 1993.

The sculpture is installed at the intersection of Southwest 11th and Market, as of 2018.

See also

 1985 in art

References

External links
 Yankee Champion at Tom Morandi's official website
 Yankee Champion, 1983 at cultureNOW
 Yankee Champion at the Oregon Public Percent for Art Digital Collection, University of Oregon Libraries
 Portland Cultural Tours: Public Art Walking Tour, Regional Arts & Culture Council (PDF)

1985 establishments in Oregon
1985 sculptures
Abstract sculptures in Oregon
Outdoor sculptures in Portland, Oregon
Portland State University campus
Stainless steel sculptures in Oregon